The 1935 Pittsburgh Pirates season was the team's third season since its formation two years prior. The 1935 Pirates (would later be renamed in 1940) fired former coach Luby DiMeolo after completing the '34 season with a 2–10 record. They brought in Duquesne head coach, Joe Bach, who improved their record to 4-8, and stayed until the next season before returning to coach in college.

Regular season

Schedule

Standings

Game summaries

Week 1 (Friday September 13, 1935): Philadelphia Eagles 

at Temple Stadium, Philadelphia, Pennsylvania

 Game time: 
 Game weather: 
 Game attendance: 20,000
 Referee:

Scoring Drives:

 Philadelphia – Manske 1 pass from Kirkman (Kirkman kick)
 Pittsburgh – Casper 1 run (Niccolai kick)
 Pittsburgh – Ribble blocked punt recovery in end zone (Niccolai kick)
 Pittsburgh – FG Niccolai 47

Week 2 (Sunday September 22, 1935): New York Giants  

at Forbes Field, Pittsburgh, Pennsylvania

 Game time: 
 Game weather: 
 Game attendance: 23,298
 Referee:

Scoring Drives:

 New York – Richards 13 run (Strong kick)
 New York – Burnett 45 pass from Danowski (Strong kick)
 New York – Molenda 30 interception (Strong kick)
 New York – Clancy 10 run (Sarausky kick)
 Pittsburgh – Weisenbaugh 3 pass from Gildea (Niccolai kick)
 New York – Burnett 25 pass from Danowski (Strong kick)
 New York – Sarausky 10 run (Molenda kick)
Notes: New York head coach Steve Owen admits in 1935 that he "shaved" the game, ordering his Giants to fumble 3 times inside the 10 & didn't call a pass play in the 4th quarter, the world's first public admission of game fixing.

Week 3 (Sunday September 29, 1935): Chicago Bears  

at Forbes Field, Pittsburgh, Pennsylvania

 Game time: 
 Game weather: 
 Game attendance: 11,858
 Referee:

Scoring Drives:

 Chicago Bears – Pollock 13 pass from Masterson (Manders kick)
 Chicago Bears – Johnsos 18 pass from Molesworth (Manders kick)
 Chicago Bears – Johnsos 13 pass from Dunlap (kick failed)
 Chicago Bears – FG Kopcha 26
 Pittsburgh – Casper lateral from Sortet after pass from Gildea (Niccolai kick)

Week 4 (Sunday October 6, 1935): Green Bay  

at East Stadium, Green Bay, Wisconsin

 Game time: 
 Game weather: 
 Game attendance: 5,000
 Referee:

Scoring Drives:

 Green Bay – Sauer 3 run (Schwammel kick)
 Green Bay – Laws run (kick failed)
 Green Bay – Hutson 50 pass from Herber (Smith kick)
 Green Bay – Hutson 1 pass from Herber (Engebretsen kick)

Week 5 (Wednesday October 9, 1935): Philadelphia Eagles  

at Forbes Field, Pittsburgh, Pennsylvania

 Game time: 
 Game weather: 
 Game attendance: 6,271
 Referee:

Scoring Drives:

 Philadelphia – Matesic 2 run (Reese kick)
 Philadelphia – FG Reese 40
 Philadelphia – Carter 58 pass from Storm (Reese kick)
 Pittsburgh – Weisenbaugh 10 pass from Doehring (kick failed)

Week 6 (Sunday October 20, 1935): Chicago Cardinals  

at Forbes Field, Pittsburgh, Pennsylvania

 Game time: 
 Game weather: 
 Game attendance: 7,000
 Referee:

Scoring Drives:

 Pittsburgh – Casper 14 pass from Doehring (Niccolai kick)
 Chicago Cardinals – Sarboe 80 punt return (Smith kick)
 Pittsburgh – FG Niccolai 22
 Chicago Cardinals – Nichelini 5 run (kick blocked)
 Pittsburgh – Strutt 74 interception (Niccolai kick)

Week 7 (Sunday October 27, 1935): Boston Redskins  

at Forbes Field, Pittsburgh, Pennsylvania

 Game time: 
 Game weather: 
 Game attendance: 12,000
 Referee:

Scoring Drives:

 Pittsburgh – FG Niccolai 41
 Pittsburgh – FG Niccolai 46

Week 8 (Sunday November 3, 1935): Brooklyn Dodgers  

at Forbes Field, Pittsburgh, Pennsylvania

 Game time: 
 Game weather: 
 Game attendance: 13,390
 Referee:

Scoring Drives:

 Brooklyn – Becker pass from Franklin (Kercheval kick)
 Brooklyn – Hubbard 56 pass from Kercheval (kick blocked)
 Pittsburgh – Wetzel 1 run (Niccolai kick)

Week 9 (Sunday November 10, 1935): Brooklyn Dodgers  

at Ebbets Field, Brooklyn, New York

 Game time: 
 Game weather: 
 Game attendance: 18,000
 Referee:

Scoring Drives:

 Brooklyn – Grossman 5 run (Kercheval kick)
 Pittsburgh – Levey 34 pass from Gildea (kick blocked)
 Pittsburgh – FG Niccolai 25
 Pittsburgh – Levey run (Niccolai kick)

Week 11 (Sunday November 24, 1935): Green Bay Packers  

at Forbes Field, Pittsburgh, Pennsylvania

 Game time: 
 Game weather: 
 Game attendance: 12,902
 Referee:

Scoring Drives:

 Green Bay – Sauer 3 run (kick blocked)
 Green Bay – Sauer 75 interception (Smith kick)
 Pittsburgh – Levey 3 run (Niccolai kick)
 Green Bay – McNally 41 pass from Monnett (Smith kick)
 Pittsburgh –  Levey 13 pass from Turley (Niccolai kick)
 Green Bay – Hinkle 2 run (Smith kick)
 Green Bay – McNally 11 interception (Smith kick)

Week 12 (Sunday December 1, 1935): Boston Redskins  

at Fenway Park, Boston, Massachusetts

 Game time: 
 Game weather: 
 Game attendance: 5,000
 Referee:

Scoring Drives:

 Pittsburgh – FG Niccolai 27
 Boston – Musick run (Musick kick)
 Boston – Renter 19 run (kick failed)

Week 13 (Sunday December 8, 1935): New York Giants  

at Polo Grounds, New York, New York

 Game time: 
 Game weather: 
 Game attendance: 7,000
 Referee:

Scoring Drives:

 New York – FG Newman 29
 New York – Goodwin 65 pass from Danowski (Strong kick)
 New York – FG Strong 44

References

Pittsburgh Steelers seasons
Pittsburgh Pirates
Pittsburg Pir